Chocowinity Bay is located on the Pamlico River in Chocowinity, North Carolina, in the United States.  Two of the major activities on Chocowinity Bay are fishing and boating. A wide range of fish can be found all within the bay.

External links 
 TopoQuest topographic map

Bays of North Carolina
Bodies of water of Beaufort County, North Carolina